Nazareth High School is a public high school located in Nazareth, Pennsylvania in the Lehigh Valley region of eastern Pennsylvania. It is the only high school in the Nazareth Area School District and serves grades 9 through 12. Its mascot is the Blue Eagle and school colors are blue and white.

As of the 2021–22 school year, the school had an enrollment of 1,576 students and 93.68 classroom teachers (on an FTE basis) for a student–teacher ratio of 16.82, according to National Center for Education Statistics data. There were 226 students eligible for free lunch and  25 eligible for reduced-cost lunch.

As of the 2009–2010 school year, the high school obtained ful accreditation by the Middle States Association of Colleges and Schools. In 2012, Nazareth Area High School received the Keystone Award from the Pennsylvania Department of Education for achieving annual progress for two consecutive years as measured by the Pennsylvania System of School Assessment (PSSA) tests. Nazareth Area High School has also appeared on the College Boards Advanced Placement Honor Roll for the last four consecutive years, out of the five it has been awarded, one of just two Pennsylvania schools to do so. Nazareth Area High School has an AP test passing rate of 87%, above state average of 69% and global average of 61%.

History

The current high school was first built in 1954 and opened to students on October 3, 1955. It was dedicated on April 8, 1956 to Frederic A. Marcks, a former teacher and the first Superintendent of the Nazareth Area School District, following the merger of the regional districts. The original construction of the building consisted of two floors of academic classrooms with an auditorium, a gym, and a large cafeteria.  In 1971, the school underwent construction of a new wing consisting mainly of classrooms which made the school twice as large as it was originally intended to be. In addition to new classrooms, the addition included a new library (currently the Sharon L. Adams Library and Media Center), expanded the cafeteria to nearly four times its original size, and added onto the current gym, doubling the size while also adding a lower level which housed a fitness room and coach's offices.  In 1998, the school experienced a mold problem which destroyed most of the old ceilings in the original building while causing the lead paint in the 1971 addition to chip faster than expected.  The problem was deemed a health issue and the school was forced to close for emergency renovations.  That same year, with the new middle school built, the old junior high school (constructed in 1983) became the school's "North Campus".

Today the school retains these modifications, which assist in facilitating student and faculty population growth.  It has also allowed smaller class sizes, as well as adding another gym and housing the Nazareth Area School District offices.  In 1999 the new auditorium and music wing were constructed.  The new auditorium was twice the size of the old auditorium and housed a complete light and sound power station with two floors of stage equipment storage.  The music wing contains an instrument storage facility, practice rooms, offices, and classrooms that can hold 200+ students at a time.

Extracurricular activities

Athletics 

Nazareth Area High School competes athletically in the Eastern Pennsylvania Conference (EPC) in the District XI division of the Pennsylvania Interscholastic Athletic Association, one of the premier high school athletic divisions in the nation. Nazareth's main Eastern Pennsylvania Conference athletic rivals are Northampton High School, Parkland High School, Freedom High School, and Easton High School.

Nazareth is one of eleven Lehigh Valley-area high schools with an ice hockey team; the team is a member of the Lehigh Valley Scholastic Ice Hockey League.

Arts
 Choral Programs
 General Art
 Guitar & Piano
 Nazareth Area Blue Eagle Marching Band
 Nazareth Area Theatre Troupe

Blue Eagle Marching Band

About 
The Nazareth Area Blue Eagle Marching Band is one of many arts programs a part of the Nazareth Area High School. The band has been performing field shows since 1980 and has competed in a number of different competitive circuits; including U.S. Bands and Cavalcade of Bands. The band has won multiple nation championships. Their most recent accomplishment includes winning the Cavalcade of Bands Yankee open-class championships in November, 2021, at Hershey, Pennsylvania.

 2008 USSBA Group 4 Open (Northern States Championship) – 1st Place
 2008 USSBA National Championship (Group 4 Open and Grand National Champion)
 2010 USSBA Group 4 Open Championship (Northern States) – 1st Place
 2010 USSBA Group 4 National Championship – 1st Place
 2012 USBands Group 4 Pennsylvania State Championship – 1st Place
 2013 USBands Group 4 Pennsylvania State Championship - 1st Place
 2013 USBands Group 4 Mid-Atlantic States Championship - 1st Place
 2014 USBands Group 4 National Championship – 1st Place. 
 2015 USBands Group 4 Pennsylvania State Championship – 1st Place
 2019 Cavalcade of Bands Patriot Open - 1st Place
 2021 Cavalcade of Bands Yankee Open - 1st place - High Visual - High Music - High Overall Effect

Eagle Nest Gallery
The Eagle Nest Gallery, located in the high school, is a professional gallery which hosts artists from the community in monthly shows. The gallery can show both two-dimensional and three-dimensional pieces. Each month a gallery reception is held, where the public can meet and talk with the artists.

Notable alumni
 Jeff Andretti, former professional racing driver
 Michael Andretti, former professional racing driver and current racing team owner, Andretti Autosport
 Emil Alexander de Schweinitz, former bacterioloist
 Jahan Dotson, professional football player, Washington Commanders
 Sage Karam, professional racing driver
 Milou Mackenzie, Pennsylvania State Representative
 Kate Micucci, actress, comedian, artist and singer-songwriter
 Jordan White, rock musician 
 Glennys Young, historian and history department chairman, University of Washington

References

External links

Official website
Nazareth Area High School athletics official website
Nazareth Area High School on Facebook
Nazareth Area High School athletics on Twitter
Nazareth Area High School profile at U.S. News & World Report
Nazareth Area High School at Niche
 Nazareth Area High School sports coverage at The Express-Times

1955 establishments in Pennsylvania
Educational institutions established in 1955
Public high schools in Pennsylvania
Schools in Northampton County, Pennsylvania